Windows Mobile Smartphone is a smartphone running the Windows Mobile Standard operating system. The hardware specifications for the devices is known as "Windows Mobile Standard".

History
The Windows Mobile OS was born out of a brief partnership between Sendo, a British telecommunications manufacturer and Microsoft. The contract provided for source code published by Microsoft, to enable Sendo to create the then-name Windows Pocket PC OS for their products.
Microsoft withheld major blocks of the code, passing the work to Taiwanese electronics company HTC, and enabling them to create the HTC Canary, based on the Smartphone/WM Standard OS.

Description
Windows Mobile Smartphones were introduced with the Pocket PC 2002 operating system for Pocket PCs. Although in the broad sense of the term "Smartphone", both Pocket PC phones and Microsoft branded Smartphones each fit into this category, Microsoft's use of the term "Smartphone" includes only more specific hardware devices that differ from Pocket PC phones. Such Smartphones were originally designed without touchscreens, intended to be operated more efficiently with only one hand, and typically had lower display resolutions than Pocket PCs. Microsoft's focus for the Smartphone platform was to create a device that functioned well as a phone and data device in a more integrated manner.

Products
The following is a partial list of Windows Mobile Smartphones.
Sendo Z100
HTC Canary
T-Mobile Dash

References

Smartphones
Windows Mobile devices